New Atlanta Stadium may refer to:

 Mercedes-Benz Stadium
 Truist Park